The ruddy-headed goose (Chloephaga rubidiceps) is a species of waterfowl in tribe Tadornini of subfamily Anserinae. It is found in Argentina, Chile, and the Falkland Islands.

Taxonomy and systematics

The ruddy-headed goose is monotypic.

Description

Males weigh  and females . Adults have the same plumage. Their heads and necks are red-brown, their back, breast, and flanks gray and buff with brown barring, their belly cinnamon, and their tail black. Their wing's upperside is gray and the underside gray, black, and white. Their bill is black and the legs and feet orange with black markings. Juveniles are similar to adults but duller overall.

Distribution and habitat

The ruddy-headed goose is found in the eastern Chilean and Argentinian parts of Tierra del Fuego and north from there to Buenos Aires Province, Argentina. It is also found on the Falkland Islands. It inhabits open landscapes such as meadows, Pampas wetlands, the borders of ponds, and coastal grasslands.

Behavior

Movement

Ruddy-headed geese are year-round residents of the Falkland Islands, though they make local movements there. The species nests in Tierra del Fuego and far southern mainland Argentina and for the winter migrates north from there as far as Argentina's Buenos Aires Province.

Feeding

The ruddy-headed goose is almost entirely vegetarian and feeds mostly on the ground rather than in water. On the breeding grounds its diet is small berries and the roots, leaves, stems, and seeds of grasses and sedges. During winter it feeds on young wheat and in harvested fields of maize, sunflower, and sorghum.

Breeding

The ruddy-headed goose's breeding season begins as early as September on the Falkland Islands and in mid-October on the mainland. It nests singly or in small loose groups. Nests are placed in long grass or amid boulders and are lined with down. The clutch size is three to eight eggs. Males guard females during the incubation period of about 30 days. The time to fledging is not known.

Vocalization

Male and female ruddy-headed geese have different vocalizations: Males make a "short, whistled 'seep'" and females a "short rasping quack".

Status

The IUCN has assessed the ruddy-headed goose as being of Least Concern, though its population size is unknown and believed to be decreasing. The population in the Falklands appears robust but that in Tierra del Fuego and mainland South America may be only a few hundred birds after major decline in the 20th century. A major cause of the crash is predation by the South American gray fox, which was introduced to Tierra del Fuego in the 1950s to control rabbits. A Memorandum of Understanding was negotiated in 2006 with Argentina and Chile under the Bonn Convention in an attempt to safeguard the remaining migratory Tierra del Fuego/mainland population.

References

Further reading
 

Geese
Chloephaga
Birds of the Falkland Islands
Birds of Tierra del Fuego
Birds described in 1861
Taxa named by Philip Sclater